Barotziland–North-Western Rhodesia was a British protectorate in south central Africa formed in 1899. It encompassed North-Western Rhodesia and Barotseland.

The protectorate was administered under charter by the British South Africa Company. It was the largest of what were colloquially referred to as the three Rhodesian protectorates, the other two being Southern Rhodesia and North-Eastern Rhodesia. It was amalgamated with North-Eastern Rhodesia, another territory administered by the British South Africa Company, to form Northern Rhodesia in 1911.

History
In 1890 the British South Africa Company signed a treaty with King Lewanika of the Barotse, the most powerful traditional ruler in the Barotse territory. King Lewanika signed the treaty because he was fearful of attack from the Portuguese (in Angola to the west) and from the Ndebele (Matabele) to the east and so wished to have British protection.

The treaty did not confer protectorate status on the territory, as only the British government could confer that status. Nonetheless, the charter gave the Barotse territory protection while conferring on the Company rights over the territory's minerals as well as trading rights.

In 1897 Robert Coryndon, private secretary to Cecil Rhodes, was sent by Rhodes to be the British South Africa Company representative in Barotseland. In October 1897 he reached King Lewanika's capital, Lealui, where he was given a cool reception. Lewanika could not initially accept that Coryndon could represent both the British South Africa Company and the United Kingdom government.

However, in November 1899 Queen Victoria signed the Barotziland–North Western Rhodesia Order in Council, 1899. This Order amalgamated what was North-Western Rhodesia with Barotseland and established over the whole territory a protectorate named Barotziland–North-Western Rhodesia. Protectorate status was welcomed by King Lewanika.

Under the Order, a regime for the Company's governance of the new protectorate was established. The new protectorate was administered by an Administrator appointed by the High Commissioner for South Africa. The High Commissioner legislated by proclamation for the protectorate. The protectorate was divided into nine administrative districts.

In September 1900 Coryndon was appointed as the first Administrator. He held this post until 1907. Coryndon was replaced by Robert Codrington, who died within a year of taking up office as Administrator. The last person to serve as Administrator was Lawrence Aubrey Wallace. The capital was initially at Kalomo, and moved in 1907 to Livingstone.

When the protectorate was amalgamated with North-Eastern Rhodesia to form Northern Rhodesia in 1911, the Administrator of Northern Rhodesia took over the functions that had been carried out by the Administrator of Barotziland–North-Western Rhodesia.

Laws
The laws of England applied to the protectorate, as far as local circumstances permitted. In actions between natives, native law and custom prevailed, save so far as the same were incompatible with the due exercise of His Britannic Majesty's power and jurisdiction. The High Commissioner was empowered to provide for the administration of justice. An Administrator's Court was established, consisting of three judges, of whom the Administrator was president, and Magistrates' Courts were also set up. Decisions of these Courts could be appealed to the Administrator's Court. Appeals from the Protectorate Courts could be made to the Supreme Court of Cape Colony and from there to the Privy Council in the United Kingdom.

See also
 British South Africa Company
 Company rule in Rhodesia
 Rhodesia (name)
 Northern Rhodesia

References

History of Zambia
Northern Rhodesia
States and territories established in 1899
States and territories disestablished in 1911
Former British protectorates
1899 establishments in Africa
1911 disestablishments in Africa
1899 establishments in the British Empire
1911 disestablishments in the British Empire
Former British colonies and protectorates in Africa